Michelle Stephenson (born 3 January 1977) is a British pop singer and television presenter. At the age of 17, she was briefly a member of the girl group that would go on to become the Spice Girls.

Touch (Spice Girls)
Alongside Melanie Brown, Victoria Beckham, Melanie Chisholm and Geri Halliwell, Stephenson completed the original 1994 line-up of Touch, a girl group that would later go on to become the Spice Girls. Stephenson received the highest scores at the first audition, where she sang Dina Carroll's song "Don't Be a Stranger". Stephenson was a member of the group for only a short period before commitment issues prompted Heart Management to remove her. According to Bob Herbert, she was fired because "she just wasn't fitting in... she would never have gelled with it and I had to tell her to go". Stephenson later challenged Herbert's claim, stating that it was her decision to leave due to her mother being diagnosed with breast cancer. Beckham later dismissed this claim, saying she "just couldn't be arsed" to put in the work the rest of the group was doing. Chisholm stated in her 2022 memoir, Who I Am: My Story, that Michelle was undecided if she wanted to remain in the band or attend university, and that she did not share the same passion for the band as the others, even being found sunbathing during early rehearsals. Stephenson was replaced by Emma Bunton.

Stephenson has given several conflicting interviews about her time with the group, stating that she both does and does not regret leaving them. She has also joked she would have been known as Mel S and it would have been confusing if the band also had a Mel C and a Mel B, and has also asserted she was going to be known as Sexy Spice. Stephenson claims she was very close with Geri whilst in the band and wishes they had remained friends, but noted in an interview that she and Beckham did not always see eye to eye. 

Stephenson's boldest claim was that the reason Beckham does not have any solo lines in the group's first song "Wannabe" is due to the single being written with Stephenson as part of the group, Beckham subsequently refusing to take Stephenson's solo lines. However, many other accounts suggest that "Wannabe" was written after Stephenson had left the group, and that Beckham's absence from the track was due to a scheduling conflict during the writing sessions.

Presenting and music
Stephenson worked briefly as a television presenter for LWT, ITV, Friendly TV, and BSkyB.  She also filmed a television show in Malta called Wild Games before forming a songwriting partnership with Ben Hackett and Mike Edwards (under the name SHEsongs).  She has also worked as a session singer for various record companies.  She performed backing vocals for singers like Ricky Martin and Julio Iglesias, while working on her own songs as well.  In November 2003, Stephenson recorded and released an EP entitled SHESongs, featuring six songs called "In Control", "Fall Over", "Hey Sugar", "Dirty Music", "Boom, Boom", and "Happens for a Reason".

Filmography
{| class="wikitable sortable"
! Year
! Title
! Role
! class="unsortable" | Notes
|-
| 2001
| London Weekend Television
| Presenter
|5 episodes
|-
| 2001
| Raw Spice
| Herself
|Documentary
|-
| 2008
| E! True Hollywood Story'
| Herself
|Documentary'
|-
|}

Albums
1997: Spice Girls – Old Spice the Early Years (Interview)
2003: SHEsongs'' (EP)

See also
List of pre-fame band departures

References

External links
 https://web.archive.org/web/20090105165745/http://www.myspace.com/mchellestephensonOfficial Michelle Stephenson's Myspace
 https://web.archive.org/web/20070218072957/http://www.flingflang.co.uk/shesongs.html
 http://www.purevolume.com/michellestephenson

1977 births
Living people
People from Abingdon-on-Thames
English women singers
English television presenters
21st-century English women singers
21st-century English singers
Spice Girls